Ileen Maisel is an American-born film producer, living in the United Kingdom.  In 2009, she was one of the founders of Amber Entertainment. Previously she was Senior Vice President of European Production for New Line Cinema.  She was nominated for the 1999 Alexander Korda Award for BAFTA Award for Best Film for Onegin.

Filmography
Twelfth Night: Or What You Will (1996) – Executive Producer
Onegin (1999) – Producer
Ripley's Game (2002) – Producer
Birth (2004) – Executive Producer
The Golden Compass (2007) – Executive Producer
Inkheart (2008) – Executive Producer
Molly Moon and the Incredible Book of Hypnotism (2015) - Producer

References

External links
 
 Biography at Amberentertainment.com

American film producers
Living people
Year of birth missing (living people)
Place of birth missing (living people)